The State Soldiers Home Barn, at 2500 Minnekahta Ave. in Hot Springs, South Dakota, was built in 1929.  Also known as the Michael J. Fitzmaurice South Dakota Veterans Home Barn, it was listed on the National Register of Historic Places in 2009.

It is a Gothic-arch barn.

It was built at cost of $6,500 and was intended to help the Michael J. Fitzmaurice State Veterans Home, formerly known as the State Soldiers Home, be close to self-sufficient in food.

References

Barns in South Dakota
Gothic-arch barns
National Register of Historic Places in South Dakota
Buildings and structures completed in 1929
Fall River County, South Dakota